Gaspar de Andrada (born in Toledo) was a Spanish clergyman and bishop for the Roman Catholic Archdiocese of Tegucigalpa. He was ordained in 1588. He was appointed bishop in 1587. He died in 1612.

References 

1612 deaths
Spanish Roman Catholic bishops
People from Toledo, Spain
Roman Catholic bishops of Comayagua